Uh Huh is the ninth studio album by The Jazz Crusaders recorded in 1967 and released on the Pacific Jazz label.

Reception

AllMusic rated the album with 4½ stars; in their review, Scott Yanow said: "Their brand of soulful hard bop (utilizing their distinctive tenor-trombone frontline) is heard throughout at its prime".

Track listing 
 "Blue Monday" (Joe Sample) - 9:45
 "Night Theme" (Stix Hooper) - 7:36
 "Uh Huh" (Wayne Henderson) - 6:20
 "Air Waves" (Sample) - 9:21
 "Ice Water" (Henderson) - 6:41
 "Watts Happening" (Sample) - 5:12

Personnel 
Wayne Henderson - trombone
Wilton Felder - tenor saxophone
Joe Sample - piano
Buster Williams - bass
Stix Hooper - drums

References 

The Jazz Crusaders albums
1967 albums
Pacific Jazz Records albums